The Princess and The Butterfly: or, The Fantastics is a comedy in five acts by Arthur Wing Pinero first produced at London’s St. James's Theatre on March 25, 1897 and in New York at the Lyceum Theatre on November 23, 1897. The New York version of The Princess and the Butterfly was somewhat abbreviated from the four-hour production that originally played in London.

Synopsis
Act I, London.—at Princess Pannonia's residence on Park Lane. 
Act II, London.—at St. Roche's residence on Grosvenor Place. (Some Weeks Elapse.) 
Act III, Paris.—at Princess Pannonia's residence on the Avenue des Champs-Filysees.
Act IV, Paris.—same as act III, different room. (A Month Passes.) 
Act V, Paris—an orchard, near Fontenay-Sous-Bois.

Princess Pannonia is the English-born wife of a Hungarian noble who has spent the last twenty years of her life living in the remote castle of Mornavitza. After her husband dies, the princess returns to London where she falls in love with Sir George Lamorant, an old friend once known as "the butterfly." Their plans to marry though are soon complicated by a shared fear of approaching middle age.

Dramatic Technique, By George Pierce Baker, 1919
In The Princess and the Butterfly, Act I not only disposes of preliminary necessary exposition, but depicts different kinds of restlessness in a group of women at or nearing middle age. Act II does the same for a group of men, and in the proposed duel provides what later may be made to reveal to Sir George how much Fay Zuliani cares for him. Act III complicates the story by showing that Fay is not the niece of Sir George, and illustrates the growing affection between the Princess and Edward Oriel. Act IV reveals to Sir George and Fay how much each cares for the other. The fifth act shows how Sir George and the Princess, who have tried to be wise and restrained, impulsively and instinctively, choose the path of seeming unwisdom but immediate happiness.

Reception
The Era commented, "Mr Pinero's latest piece possesses in a high degree the rare and subtle quality of tone. And to deserve this praise though five acts and four hours is such a supreme achievement for a dramatist." The Pall Mall Gazette called the piece "the most interesting of the original plays to be seen at present on the London boards, and probably the most interesting that has been seen on them for a considerable time". The Evening Standard found the play "at once fantastic and true to life … very much indeed of a love story for no fewer than three pairs of lovers are left on the verge of matrimony.

The Opera Glass, 1897, commented on the American production:

The American University Magazine, 1897, said, "The delightful play, The Princess and the Butterfly, will doubtless have a long run at the Lyceum. The public appreciates that It is getting a good deal for one's ticket to have two leading roles with Mary Mannering and Julie Opp to fill them".

Original London and New York Casts 

Sources: Arthur Wing Pinero, Playwright: a Study by Hamilton Fyfe, 1902 and Plays of the Present by John Bouvé Clapp and Edwin Francis Edgett, 1902

References

External links

1897 plays
West End plays
Plays by Arthur Wing Pinero